Mandira is a 1990 Bengali film directed by Sujit Guha and produced by Pahlaj Nihalani. It is a remake of 1980 Hindi film Aasha. The film features actors Prosenjit Chatterjee, Indrani Haldar, Sonam in the lead roles. Music of the film has been composed by Bappi Lahiri.

Cast 
 Prosenjit Chatterjee as Shantanu
 Indrani Haldar as Sudeepa
 Sonam as Mandira
 Chunky Pandey
 Neelam
 Pradeep Kumar
 Shakuntala Barua

Songs
"Sab Lal Pathor" (Happy) – Lata Mangeshkar
"Sab Lal Pathor" (Sad) – Lata Mangeshkar
"Tumi Jemoni Nupur" (Happy) – Bappi Lahiri
"Tumi Jemoni Nupur" (Sad) – Bappi Lahiri
"Joy Gobindo Joy Gopal" – Anupama Deshpande
"Asun Kinun Putul" – Reema Lahiri
"Dhin Dhina Dhin Tak Dhina – Amit Kumar, Shabbir Kumar
"Tomay Chhere Ami" - Amit Kumar, Alka Yagnik 
"Sangeete Aaj Amra Dujon" – Mohammed Aziz, Sabina Yasmin

References

External links
 

Bengali-language Indian films
1990 films
Films scored by Bappi Lahiri
1990s Bengali-language films
Films directed by Sujit Guha